Kokoroko (stylised as KOKOROKO) is a London-based eight-piece musical group led by Sheila Maurice-Grey, playing a fusion of jazz and Afrobeat. In February 2019 they were named "ones to watch" by the Guardian, after their track "Abusey Junction" garnered 23 million views on YouTube. In February 2020 they won Best Group at the Urban Music Awards. In September 2020 they played BBC Proms at the Royal Albert Hall.

They released their debut album Could We Be More in August 2022.

Discography 
EPs
 Kokoroko (2019) 
 Baba Ayoola / Carry Me Home (2020)
Albums
 Could We Be More (2022), Brownswood – No. 30 UK Albums Chart

References 

Afro-beat musical groups
British jazz ensembles
Musical groups from London